Clément Enzo Florian Di Fiore  (12 October 1990 – 9 November 2019), better known by his stage name  Népal, was a French rapper and beatmaker. He was also known as KLM and GrandMaster Splinter. A co-founding member of the collective 75e Session, he produced their EP 16par16 in 2014. He also formed with Doum's as the duo 2Fingz. He was also close to the collective L'Entourage, to the band 1995 and the project Les Gars Laxistes. Népal attached great importance to remain anonymous, covering his face with a hood, a mask, or even with make up.

Népal died on 9 November 2019. He was 29. There are uncertainties about his real age as some claim he was 30 when he died (having been born in 1990 and not in 1994). The announcement came after 11 days on social networks on 20 November 2019 including the posthumous release of his album Adios Bahamas that he had just completed recording. The actual circumstances of his death are not clear, but many believe he committed suicide.

In December 2019, a graffiti work was launched as a tribute to his work by the collective 75e Session and the musical project Les Gars Laxistes. using the cover of the album Adios Bahamas, it was placed on Rue des Thermopyles in the 14e arrondissement of Paris, the suburb where he grew.

Posthumously, on 4 September 2020, the video "Sundance' was released about the daily life of rapper Nekfeu directed by Syrine Boulanouar and produced by 75e Session, based on an idea by Népal expressed just prior to his demise. Between 28 September and 2 October 2020, artists close to him released five unpublished videos by Népal.

Discography

Solo albums
(as Népal)

2FingZ albums
(duo with Doum's)  
2011: 2FingZ
2013: La folie des glandeurs

EPs and Remixes
as Grandmaster Splinter
2012: Medley Vol. 1 
2012: Medley Vol. 2 
2013: Medley Vol. 3

as Népal
2014: 16par16
2014: 16par16 Remix 
2016: 444 Nuits (as Népal)
2016: 445e Nuit (as Népal)
2018: KKSHISENSE8 (2018)

as KLM
2015: Enter The Dojo Vol. 1 (produced for 75e Session)
2017: Slow Mix 06/08/17 (remixes for 75e Session)
2018: Slow Mix 07/02/18 (remixes for 75e Session)

Singles featured in

Other charting songs

*Did not appear in the official Belgian Ultratop 50 charts, but rather in the bubbling under Tipparade charts.

Others
"James Worthy"
"Fugu"
"66 Mesures"
"Abra"

Posthumously
(all in 2020)
"Dans le fond"
"Cheddar"
"Coach K
"Même vie"
"Benji"

Collaborations
2010: Hippocampe Fou feat. Népal (KLM) - "Clash"
2011: John Doe ∅ 1 (Freestyle Anonyme)
2012: Reeko feat. Nekfeu, Alpha Wann, KLM - "Coup de crayon"
2013: Sanka feat. Népal - "Un monde imaginaire" on EP Nomade Shaolin
2014: 75e Session feat. 13 Sarkastick, Panama Bende - "La Diff" on EP Paris - Genève
2014: Di-Meh feat. Népal, Limsa - "Le taff est fait" on EP Reste calme
2014: Grünt #18 feat. 75e Session
2014: Di-Meh feat. Népal - "Paris-Genève 2" on EP Dimeh Hendrix
2014: Sheldon feat. Népal, Walter - "Le Grand Bond en avant"
2015: Di-Meh feat. Nepal - "Fu Gee La" on EP Entre le rap et la vraie vie
2015: Fonky Drü feat. 75e Session - "Azur" on EP Delta 64236
2015: FA2L feat. Népal, Losti - "Petit frère" on EP Fameux
2015: FA2L feat. Népal - "La Cigarette" on EP Fameux
2016: Nekfeu feat. Népal - "Esquimaux" on the album Cyborg
2016: Népal & Diabi - "Benjamin Franklin" on EP The Lost Draft
2016: Les Chics Types feat. Népal - "Cafard Boulevard" on EP Tout Baigne
2017: Lomepal feat. 2Fingz - "Lucy" on album Flip
2017: Di-Meh feat. Népal - "Ennemis" on EP Focus
2017: L'affreux Jojo feat. Népal - "A l'aise" on EP Portraits gachés
2018: Sopico feat. Népal - "Domo" on album YË
2018: Grünt Hors-Série feat. Doums, Nekfeu, Alpha Wann, 2zer, Framal, Mekra
2018: Bohemian Club feat. Népal - "Toxic" on EP Substance M
2018: Troisième Freestyle de la série "Règlement Space" de la chaine du Règlement
2019: M le Maudit feat. Népal - "ÉVEIL" on EP I HATE LOVE
2019: WondaGurl feat. Népal - "City Lights, Pt.2" on EP Toronto - Paris
2019: Fixpen Sill feat. Népal - "Touareg" on album FLAG
2019: Doum's feat. Népal - "Le fer" on album Pilote & Co

References

French rappers
1994 births
2019 deaths